First Lady is a play by George S. Kaufman and Katharine Dayton. It premiered on Broadway at the Music Box Theatre on November 26, 1935, closing in June 1936 after 246 performances. A hit with the public, the play was made into a film of the same name in 1937. The original Broadway production was directed by Kaufman and used sets by Donald Oenslager and costumes by John Hambleton. The cast included Jane Cowl as Lucy Chase Wayne, Stanley Ridges as Stephen Wayne, Oswald Yorke as Carter Hibbard, and Lily Cahill as Irene Hibbard.

External links

Plays by George S. Kaufman
Broadway plays
1935 plays
American plays adapted into films